Myron Claude "Red" Hayworth (May 14, 1916 – November 2, 2006) was an American professional baseball player, manager, coach and scout. Hayworth batted and threw right-handed.

Baseball career
Hayworth was born in High Point, North Carolina. He spent more than 50 years in baseball. Considered a light-hitting but solid catcher, he started his professional career in 1936 with the Akron Yankees. After eight years in the minor leagues, he entered the majors in 1944 as one of two catchers for the only St. Louis Browns club to ever win an American League pennant. He shared duties with Frank Mancuso, hitting .222 in 90 games. The Browns lost to the St. Louis Cardinals in the 1944 World Series as Hayworth started all six games, collecting two hits in 17 at bats with one run and an RBI. He played his last majors season with St. Louis in 1945.

In a two-season career, Hayworth was a .212 hitter (91-for-430) with one home run and 42 RBI in 146 games, including 27 runs, 15 doubles, and one triple.

Following his major league career, Hayworth played, managed and coached in the minor leagues and later served as a scout until the late 1980s. His older brother, Ray Hayworth, also was a major league catcher.

Hayworth died in his hometown of High Point, North Carolina, at the age of 90.

References

External links

 Baseball Almanac
 Historic Baseball
 Retrosheet
 SABR

1916 births
2006 deaths
Major League Baseball catchers
St. Louis Browns players
Syracuse Chiefs players
Atlanta Braves scouts
Baltimore Orioles scouts
Milwaukee Braves scouts
New York Yankees scouts
San Francisco Giants scouts
Minor league baseball managers
Baseball players from North Carolina
Sportspeople from High Point, North Carolina